The Great Northern Railway (Ireland) (GNR(I) or GNRI) was an Irish gauge railway company in Ireland. It was formed in 1876 by a merger of the Irish North Western Railway (INW), Northern Railway of Ireland, and Ulster Railway. The governments of Ireland and Northern Ireland jointly nationalised the company in 1953, and the company was liquidated in 1958: assets were split on national lines between the Ulster Transport Authority and Córas Iompair Éireann.

Foundation
The Portadown, Dungannon and Omagh Junction Railway together with the Londonderry and Enniskillen Railway enabled GNRI trains between Derry and Belfast to compete with the Belfast and Northern Counties Railway, and both this and the Dundalk route gave connections between Derry and Dublin. These main lines supported the development of an extensive branch network serving the southwest half of Ulster and northern counties of Leinster. The GNRI became Ireland's most prosperous railway company and second largest railway network.

 
In its early years the GNR(I) closely imitated the image of its English namesake, adopting an apple green livery for its steam locomotives and a varnished teak finish for its passenger coaches. Later the company adopted its famous pale blue livery for locomotives (from 1932), with the frames and running gear picked out in scarlet. Passenger vehicles were painted brown, instead of varnished. The train was divided, but during the uncoupling operation ten carriages ran away and collided with another passenger train. A total of 80 people were killed and 260 were injured in what was then the deadliest railway accident to have occurred in Europe. The accident remains the deadliest ever to have occurred on the island of Ireland.

Growth and partition

In the early 20th century increasing traffic led the GNRI to consider introducing larger locomotives. The Great Southern & Western Railway had introduced express passenger locomotives with a 4-6-0 wheel arrangement, and the GNRI wanted to do the same. However, the lifting shop in the GNRI Dundalk works was too short to build or overhaul a 4-6-0, so the company persisted with 4-4-0 locomotives for even the heaviest and fastest passenger trains. This led to the GNRI to order a very modern and powerful class of 4-4-0's, the Class V three cylinder compound locomotives built by Beyer, Peacock & Company in 1932. This class has been compared with another notable V class, that introduced by the Southern Railway in England in 1930.

The Partition of Ireland in 1921 created a border through the GNRI's territory. The new border crossed all three of its main lines and some of its secondary lines. The imposition of border controls caused some service disruption, with main line trains having to stop at both Dundalk and Goraghwood stations. This was not eased until 1947 when customs and immigration facilities for Dublin–Belfast expresses were opened at Dublin Amiens Street and Belfast Great Victoria Street stations.

Nationalisation and division

A combination of the increasing road competition facing all railways and a change in patterns of economic activity caused by the Partition of Ireland reduced the GNRI's prosperity. The company modernised and reduced its costs by introducing modern diesel multiple units on an increasing number of services in the 1940s and 1950s and by making Dublin–Belfast expresses non-stop from 1948. In Dundalk at the GNR Works the railway engineers developed railbuses for use on sections of the rural network. Nevertheless, by the 1950s the GNRI had ceased to be profitable and in 1953 the company was jointly nationalised by the governments of the Republic of Ireland and Northern Ireland. The two governments ran the railway jointly under a Great Northern Railway Board until 1958.

In May 1958, the Government of Northern Ireland's wish to close many lines led to the GNR(I) Board being dissolved and the assets divided between the two territories. At midnight on 30 September 1958, all lines entirely within Northern Ireland were transferred to the (nationalised) Ulster Transport Authority (UTA) and all lines entirely within the Republic of Ireland were transferred to Córas Iompair Éireann (CIÉ). CIÉ had been formed as a private company in 1945 but had been nationalised in 1950. In an attempt at fairness, all classes of locomotive and rolling stock were also divided equally between the transport operators of the two new owners. Most classes of GNRI locomotive had been built in small classes, so this division left both railways with an operational and maintenance difficulty of many different designs all in small numbers.

The Government of Northern Ireland, which had a very anti-rail policy, rapidly closed most of the GNR(I) lines in Northern Ireland. Exceptions were the Belfast–Dundalk and Portadown–Derry main lines and the Newry–Warrenpoint and – branches. It made the Lisburn–Antrim branch freight-only from 1960 and closed the Portadown–Derry and Newry–Warrenpoint lines to all traffic in 1965. The Republic of Ireland government tried briefly to maintain services on lines closed at the border by the Northern Ireland government, but this was impractical, and the Republic had to follow suit in closing most GNR(I) lines within the Republic. Since 1963, the –Navan branch has survived for freight traffic only.

The GNR's north western main line between Dundalk and Derry bypassed the small County Tyrone town of Fintona, which was instead served by a  branch line from Fintona Junction station. The service was operated by the double-deck Fintona horse tram until the line's closure in 1957. CIÉ also acquired the Hill of Howth Tramway, in the northern suburbs of Dublin, in the 1958 dissolution of the GNRI Board. CIÉ closed the tramway about a year later.

Today, the GNR routes remaining consist of the main line from Dublin to Belfast, the Howth branch, electrified for Dublin commuter services since 1984, the Drogheda - Navan (Tara Mines) line, which carries only freight traffic associated with that mine, passenger traffic having ceased with the closure of the line beyond there to Oldcastle in 1963, and the Lisburn to Antrim branch, now mothballed but retained in operational order for the time being.

Preservation

Rolling stock

Four GNRI steam locomotives are preserved. The Railway Preservation Society of Ireland at Whitehead owns two of its 4-4-0s (one each of classes S and Q) and has custodianship of a third 4-4-0, (V Class) which is on loan from the Ulster Folk and Transport Museum at Cultra. The RPSI periodically operates one or more of them on special excursion trains on Northern Ireland Railways and Iarnród Éireann (successor to CIÉ) routes. A 2-4-2T (JT Class) locomotive is preserved at the Ulster Folk and Transport Museum at Cultra.

Some of its coaching stock has also been preserved. 1938 built dining car No.88 still sees use as part of the Railway Preservation Society of Ireland's Dublin-based "heritage set" of coaches. Also operating in this set is a 1954 built brake coach No.9, although it currently carries the number 1949. The Downpatrick & County Down Railway also has an example of a third-class GNR six-wheeled carriage, in an unrestored condition.

Steam locomotives: V Class No. 85 (RPSI), JT Class No. 93 (UFTM), S Class No. 171 (RPSI), Q Class No. 131 (RPSI)
Tenders: No. 31 (RPSI), No. 43 (RPSI)
Carriages: Directors Saloon No. 50 (RPSI), Dining Car No. 88 (RPSI), Open Third No. 114 (RPSI), Open Third No. 1949 (RPSI), Unidentified 6-Wheeler (DCDR) 
Wagons: Brake Van No. 81 (RPSI), Grain Vans No.'s 504 & 2518 (RPSI), Parcel Van No. 788 (RPSI), Crane No. 3169 (RPSI), Ballast Wagon No. 8112N (RPSI), Unidentified Open Wagon (RPSI), Unnumbered Boiler Wagon (RPSI)
Rail-bus: E (UFTM)
Trams: Howth No. 2 (UFTM), Howth No. 4 (OERM), Howth No. 9 (NTMI), Howth No. 10 (NTM), Fintona No. 381 + trailer (UFTM) 
Road vehicles: Lorry No. 150 (NTMI), Bus No. 274 (NTMI), Bus No. 345 (C&L - converted to rail coach), Bus No. 389 (C&L), Bus No. 390 (NTMI), Bus No. 427 (NTMI), Bus No. 438 (NTMI)

Buildings

In 2011, a former GNR Signal Cabin from Bundoran Junction arrived at the Downpatrick and County Down Railway. The cabin was installed on the platform at Downpatrick railway station in October 2015, where it is to be restored to working order.

See also
 Charles Clifford, Locomotive Superintendent from 1895 to 1912.
 William Hemingway Mills, Chief Engineer from 1876.

Notes

References

Further reading

External links

Great Northern Railway Architecture at Archiseek.com
Irish Railway Record Society: Irish Railways: 1946 - 1996; Great Northern Railway (Ireland) 
 

 
Closed railways in Northern Ireland
Closed railways in Ireland
Railway companies established in 1876
Railway companies disestablished in 1958
Irish gauge railways
1876 establishments in Ireland
1958 disestablishments in Ireland
Defunct railway companies of Ireland